Jasper Nathaniel Johns (born 6 February 1995) is an English former footballer who played as a defender. Born in Stafford, he began his career as a youngster with Port Vale followed by a spell with Everton before making the switch to United.

Club career
Johns started his career at Port Vale before spending time at Everton's academy. Following his release by Everton, Johns joined Sheffield United in June 2013 on a two-year deal. Johns made his professional début for Sheffield United when he came on as a substitute in a 1–1 draw with Colchester United at Bramall Lane on 17 August 2013. This turned out to be his only appearance that season and he was released by United on 16 May 2014 when his contract expired. He joined Midland League Division One club Stafford Town in July 2017.

International career
Born in Stafford, Johns is eligible to represent England, Jamaica, Singapore, Northern Ireland and Scotland at international level. Johns earned six caps for England U16s. On 5 August 2013, Johns was called up to Northern Ireland U19s for a friendly match against Scotland U19s. Later that month he was called up again to Northern Ireland U19s for a match against Austria U19 on 11 September 2013.

Career statistics

References

1995 births
Living people
Sportspeople from Stafford
Black British sportspeople
English footballers
English people of Jamaican descent
English people of Scottish descent
English people of Northern Ireland descent
English people of Singaporean descent
British Asian footballers
England youth international footballers
Association football defenders
Port Vale F.C. players
Everton F.C. players
Sheffield United F.C. players
Stafford Town F.C. players
English Football League players